Maria Lina Isabel "Isa" Molde is a Filipino volleyball player playing for the Choco Mucho Flying Titans Volleyball Team in the Premiere Volleyball League (PVL).

Career
Molde was a member of the U17 Philippines national women's volleyball team in 2014, the Under-17 team finished 7th among 13 teams in the 2014 Asian Youth Girls Volleyball Championship. It defeated Australia and India while losing to China in straight sets in the Group C stage. In the Qualifying Round, it lost to Thailand while winning against New Zealand in 4 sets. In the Quarterfinals, it lost to South Korea. In the 5th–8th place playoffs, it lost to Kazakhstan in 5 sets. In the 7th place game, it won against New Zealand again. She joined the UP Lady Maroons for the UAAP Season 78 volleyball tournaments. Molde was the first ever Lady Maroon to bag the "Rookie of the Year" Award. She also played with the Lady Maroons for the UAAP Season 79 volleyball tournaments where they finished 5th place. In the 2015 Shakey's V-League Reinforced Conference she placed in third place with UP Lady Maroons. In the 2016 Shakey's V-League Collegiate Conference she also ranked third and won the First Best Outside Spiker individual award.

In the 2018 Premier Volleyball League Collegiate Conference, Molde became the first female athlete throughout the entire PVL history to win 2 MVP awards (Conference & Finals) plus the 1st Best Outside Hitter Award in one day.

In 2019, she was chosen to be the Team Captain and Skipper for the Philippine National U-23 Women's Volleyball Team who is set to compete for the 3rd Asian Women's U-23 Volleyball Championship in Vietnam this coming July 13–21, 2019. She is also currently the Co-Captain of the University of the Philippines Women's Volleyball Team.

Personal life
Molde was born in Catmon, Cebu, Philippines, and spent her teenage years in Manila for her high school and college studies. She went to Hope Christian High School in Manila, and as of 2016, is studying in the University of the Philippines.

Awards

Individual
 UAAP Season 78 "Rookie of the Year"
 2016 Shakey's V-League Season 13 Collegiate Conference "1st Best Outside Spiker"
 2018 Premier Volleyball League Collegiate Conference "1st Best Outside Spiker"
 2018 Premier Volleyball League Collegiate Conference "Conference Most Valuable Player"
 2018 Premier Volleyball League Collegiate Conference "Finals Most Valuable Player"'

Collegiate
Shakey's V-League 12th Season Reinforced Open Conference -  Bronze medal, with UP Fighting Lady Maroons
Shakey's V-League 13th Season Collegiate Conference -  Bronze medal, with UP Fighting Lady Maroons
2016 Founders'  Cup Philippines -   Champion, with UP Fighting Lady Maroons
2017 Founders'  Cup Philippines -   Champion, with UP Fighting Lady Maroons
 2018 Premier Volleyball League Collegiate Conference -   Champion, with UP Fighting Lady Maroons
UAAP Season 80 Beach Volleyball -  Bronze medal, with UP Fighting Lady Maroons
UAAP Season 81 Beach Volleyball -  Bronze medal, with UP Fighting Lady Maroons
2018 UniGames Indoor Volleyball - Bronze medal, with UP Fighting Lady Maroons

Club
 2018 Philippine Superliga Grand Prix –  Bronze medal, with Foton Tornadoes
2017 Premier Volleyball League All-Stars -  Champions, with Team Roger
2016 Premier Volleyball League All-Stars -  Champions, with Team Palaban

References

Living people
1998 births
Philippines women's international volleyball players
Filipino women's volleyball players
University Athletic Association of the Philippines volleyball players
University of the Philippines Diliman alumni
Wing spikers
Sportspeople from Cebu
Outside hitters